Andrew Hinson (born 17 August 1976) is an Australian former professional rugby league footballer who played for the Penrith Panthers and South Sydney in the National Rugby League (NRL).

Hinson grew up in the Blue Mountains region, attending  St Columba's Catholic College, Springwood.

From 1997 to 2001 he played in the NRL for Penrith, making 49 first-grade appearances. He featured as a winger in his first three seasons, before switching to the centre, where he played in his season at South Sydney in 2002, which was the club's first after being re-admitted to the competition.

Now based on the Sunshine Coast, Hinson has coached local club the Kawana Dolphins.

References

External links
Andrew Hinson at Rugby League project

1976 births
Living people
Australian rugby league players
Penrith Panthers players
South Sydney Rabbitohs players
Rugby league centres
Rugby league wingers
Rugby league players from New South Wales
People from the Blue Mountains (New South Wales)